Naugatuck High School is a public high school (grades 9–12) in Naugatuck, New Haven County, Connecticut, US.

 The old high school, now an intermediate school, was located on Hillside Ave. The new school is located at 543 Rubber Avenue. The building was constructed in 1959. Three wings were added during the 1970s: Castle House, Goodyear House, and the Applied Education Wing, which contains all the shop classes. The main building then became known as Judd House. Recent renovations have resulted in a re-brand of the wings of Naugatuck High School. Judd House is now known as North, Castle and Goodyear Houses have combined to become South, the Applied Education wing is East, and the gym, auxiliary gym, and pool make up West. The original building, located on Hillside Ave., was built in 1905 by McKim, Mead, and White and then was the Hillside Middle School until the 2010–2011 term when it became Hillside Intermediate School.

The school mascot is the greyhound and the school colors are garnet and grey. Naugatuck competes against other high schools in the Naugatuck Valley League. These schools include Wilby, Kennedy, Holy Cross, Crosby, Sacred Heart, Waterbury Career, Watertown, Torrington, Derby, Ansonia, St. Paul, Woodland Regional, Wolcott, Seymour, and Oxford.

NHS has a storied football rivalry with the high school in Ansonia that is one of the longest in America. Like the other high schools in the Naugatuck Valley, the two teams meet the morning of Thanksgiving Day. The first meeting was in 1900. Ansonia is the long-term winner in the series.

In 2009, the school added solar panels to its roof.

In 2013, the school began an $81 million renovation project that updated the schools interior and exterior, as well as added new technology. The project was completed in the fall of 2015.

Athletics
Men's sports offered include soccer, football, cross country, swimming, basketball, indoor and outdoor track & field, wrestling, baseball, tennis, and golf.

Women's sports offered include soccer, volleyball, cross country, swimming, basketball, indoor and outdoor track & field, softball, tennis, and golf.

All of the sports compete within the Naugatuck Valley League.

State championships

 Boys Soccer (2001, 2002, 2017 runners up) 
 Football (1981, 1993)
 Volleyball (1978)
 Boys Basketball (1922, 1930, 1931, 1942, 2015 runners up)
 Boys Swimming (1971, 1992)
 Baseball (1938, 1955, 1963,  1970, 1971, 1977)
 Boys Outdoor Track (2021 runners up)

Notable alumni

 Billy Burke, former professional golfer
 John Caneira, former MLB player (California Angels)
 Harry Cross, sportswriter (The New York Times, Evening Post, New York Herald Tribune Sunday Magazine)
 James Dalton II, United States Army general during World War II, Distinguished Service Cross recipient
 Pat Dean, former MLB player (Colorado Rockies)
 Mohamed Hrezi professional runner, represented Libya in the marathon in the 2016 Olympic Games
 Ryan Kinne, former professional soccer player for the New England Revolution
 James T. Patterson, former U.S. Representative from Connecticut
 Spec Shea, former MLB player (New York Yankees, Washington Senators)
 Dick Tuckey, former NFL player (Washington Redskins)

References

External links
 

Naugatuck, Connecticut
Schools in New Haven County, Connecticut
Public high schools in Connecticut